Luis Ahumada (born October 14, 1992, in Ciudad Victoria, Tamaulipas) is a professional Mexican footballer who currently plays for UAT.

References

External links
Luis Eduardo Ahumada García, ascensomx.net

1992 births
Living people
Correcaminos UAT footballers
Mexican footballers
People from Ciudad Victoria
Association football defenders